The Jamboaye River is a river in the province of Aceh in northern Sumatra, Indonesia, about 1600 km northwest of the capital Jakarta.

Geography
The river flows in the northern area of Sumatra with predominantly tropical rainforest climate (designated as Af in the Köppen-Geiger climate classification). The annual average temperature in the area is 24 °C. The warmest month is April, when the average temperature is around 26 °C, and the coldest is December, at 22 °C. The average annual rainfall is 3766 mm. The wettest month is December, with an average of 651 mm rainfall, and the driest is June, with 137 mm rainfall.

See also
List of rivers of Indonesia
List of rivers of Sumatra

References

Rivers of Aceh
Rivers of Indonesia